Pseudaltha sapa is a species of moth of the family Limacodidae. It is found in northern Thailand and northern Vietnam at altitudes of 1,600 to 2,400 meters.

The wingspan is 25–28 mm. Adults have a white ground colour. There are zigzag brownish basal, antemedial and postmedial fasciae on the forewings and medial and apical large black strokes. The abdomen is whitish ochre. Adults have been recorded in May, June, July and September.

Etymology
The species name sapa refers to the type locality of Sa Pa in Vietnam.

References

Limacodidae
Moths described in 2009
Moths of Asia